The Libertarian Party of Nebraska is the Nebraska affiliate of the Libertarian Party. The party is headed by chairperson Chris Childs.

Party leadership 

State Central Committee members:
 Chair – Chris Childs
 Vice Chair – Randee Otte
 Treasurer – Jeff Pitts
 Secretary – Racheal Nelson
 District 1 Coordinator – Trevor Reilly
 District 2 Coordinator – Steve Sechrest
 District 3 Coordinator – James Fellows

Ballot access 

The Libertarian Party of Nebraska submitted petitions to the Secretary of State on August 2, 2010, requesting certification as a political party.  These petitions contained approximately 8,000 signatures.  The Libertarian Party was certified by the Secretary of State's office on August 12, 2010.  The LP of Nebraska's candidate for Auditor of Public Accounts in 2010, Michele Sallach-Grace, won 20% of the vote and ensured the party would remain on the ballot through 2012.

Several Libertarians ran for office in 2012:
 Klaus Linder – La Vista Mayor
 Micheal Knebel – Bellevue City Council
 Jerry Kosch – Butler County Board of Supervisors
 Gene Siadek – Papio Missouri NRD Board
 Darrick J. Barclay – State Legislature
 Ben Backus – Gering City Council

The Libertarian Party of Nebraska received more than the 5% needed in at least one statewide general election race in 2014 to keep the party on the ballot in Nebraska through at least 2018:
 Governor – Mark Elworth, Jr. – 3.5% – 19,001 votes
 Lt. Governor – Scott Zimmerman – 3.5% – 19,001 votes
 Secretary of State – Ben Backus – 24.8% – 121,470 votes
 State Treasurer – Michael Knebel – 5.3% – 28,009 votes
 Representative in Congress – Steven Laird – District 2 – 5.3% – 9,021 votes
 Valley City Council – Felicia Jorgensen – 18% – 165 votes
 Fremont City Council – Michael Shallberg – 3rd Ward – 22.1% – 146 votes
 Johnson County Treasurer – John Sterup – 14.9% – 250 votes
 MUD Board (Outside Member) – Jonathan Corey Neurath – 7.7% – 682 votes

In 2017, Libertarian Senator Laura Ebke sponsored LB34 – a bill which gave ballot access to all parties with at least 10,000 voters without needing to collect signatures. The bill passed and became law without the signature of the Governor.

Several Libertarian Candidates ran for office in 2018;

Jim Schultz – US Senate – 24,606 Votes – 3.6%
Laura Ebke – Legislative District 32 – 6,243 Votes – 43.7%
John Sterup – Johnson County Treasurer – 440 Votes – 25.0%
John Harms – Platte County Supervisor District 1 – 367 Votes – 28.0%
Stephanie Pettit – McPherson County Treasurer – 26 Votes – 10.1%
Clint Pettit – McPherson County School Board – 53 Votes – 8.1%
Kurt Zadina – Scotts Bluff County Clerk – 2245 Votes – 22.4%
Matt Maly – Bruno Village Board – 12 Votes – 10.9%

Current elected officials 

The Libertarian Party elected their first candidate, Keith Ottersberg, in 2014. He won 70% of the vote, receiving 154 votes. In 2016, State Senator Laura Ebke changed her party affiliation from Republican to Libertarian. Also, in 2016, Ben Backus was elected to the Gering City Council, Ward 3.

References

External links 
 Libertarian Party of Nebraska

Nebraska
Political parties in Nebraska
Politics of Nebraska